The Great White Shark (Warren White), or simply Great White, is a supervillain owned by DC Comics who exists in that company's DC Universe.

Publication history
Great White Shark first appeared in Arkham Asylum: Living Hell #1 (July 2003) and was created by Dan Slott and Ryan Sook.

Fictional character biography

Origin story
First appearing in Arkham Asylum: Living Hell, crooked financier Warren White, known as the "Great White Shark" for his ruthlessness, embezzles millions from his company's pension fund and robs virtually all of the company's clients both working class and upper class of their life savings. A smug White manages to avoid prison by transferring his case to Gotham City and successfully pleading insanity to avoid prison and speed up his chances of freedom, a strategy he is all too familiar with and convinced it will work. But the plea incenses the judge hearing his case, who is disgusted with White.

Realizing that White might have actually set up a trap for himself by pleading insanity, the judge sentences White to Arkham Asylum indefinitely. There, he suffers great indignities as the new inmate, or "fish". His first cellmate is Death Rattle, a cult leader and mass murderer who plans to turn him into a human sacrifice. Early in his stay, Killer Croc slices a set of "gills" into White's neck with his claws, claiming the "fish" needs a set. Realizing his mistake in pleading insanity, White bribes his psychiatrist, Dr. Anne Carver, into having him transferred to a minimum security prison. However, Carver is revealed to have been killed and replaced by Jane Doe some months before, and she simply reports White's bribe to her superiors. Her boss, Dr. Jeremiah Arkham — who lost his pension due to White's business practices — orders all of White's transfer papers destroyed. Arkham calls White "the worst person I've ever met", a sentiment shared by several individuals - including the Joker, who states that although he has killed people, "[he] didn't steal their kid's college funds".

To survive the harassment and violence in Arkham, White allies himself with Two-Face, becoming his "coin boy" when Harvey injures his hands prior. The relationship quickly ends, however, when Death Rattle threatens the pair; Two-Face's coin flip leads him to abandon White. White then befriends Humpty Dumpty, a childlike murderer and savant, who arranges for White to become his cellmate just in time to head off Death Rattle's murder attempt.

During a prison riot, White is assaulted and locked in Mr. Freeze's subzero cell by Jane Doe, who was attempting to claim his identity and leave him for dead as she had done with Dr. Carver. His injuries, the result of horrific frostbite, leave White deformed: his skin turns a pale white, and his nose, lips, ears, hair and several of his fingers fall off. These deformities, along with his set of "gills", leave him resembling a real great white shark, an effect which he further enhances by filing his teeth to points after he is driven insane by his ordeals.

White, who was perfectly sane upon entering Arkham, is transformed into one of the "freaks" of Batman's rogues gallery. White now uses his business connections to serve as a liaison and fence for many of his fellow inmates.

One Year Later
White next appears in the storyline Batman: Face the Face, which ran through Detective Comics #817-820 and Batman #651-654, as part of the larger One Year Later storyline. In the storyline, in which Batman and Robin disappeared for a year, the Great White Shark had established himself as Gotham's reigning crime boss.

As part of a revenge plot against Two-Face for his earlier betrayal, he orders his chief enforcer, the Tally Man, to kill several criminals associated with the Penguin — including Orca, KGBeast, Magpie and Ventriloquist — to frame the newly rehabilitated Harvey Dent for the murders. Batman eventually uncovers White's involvement in these crimes, but not in time to prevent Dent, driven insane once again by paranoia, from disfiguring his own face once more and returning to a life of crime as Two-Face.

Despite his status as one of the city's most powerful criminals, the Great White Shark remains in Arkham, directing his empire from within his cell and using his imprisoned condition as a perfect alibi. He most recently appeared in Detective Comics #832, when Batman apprehends another villain who calls himself the Shark, a former member of the "Terrible Trio". When the Shark is sent to Arkham, the Great White Shark announces that he takes over his position after the Fox and the Vulture pledged their allegiances to White.

Gotham Underground
During the recent takeover of Gotham's criminal underworld by Metropolis outfits the 100 and Intergang during the Gotham Underground storyline, the Great White Shark is badly beaten and locked away following his displacement.

The Resurrection of Ra's al Ghul
After the defeat of the newly resurrected Ra's al Ghul, Warren White makes a little appearance in the final strip. He is shown clearly controlling the majority of Arkham Asylum, including its corrupt staff, and he threatens Ra's al Ghul.

Batman R.I.P. / The Battle For The Cowl
After the apparent death of the original Batman, Warren White was one of the many criminals who was being transferred from Arkham to a secure place. A new Black Mask then drugs the criminals, which causes instant death at Mask's will. Acknowledging Black Mask as their leader, Warren and his group were armed to wreak havoc on the city once again by ending Two-Face and Penguin's reigns and ultimately making Black Mask the supreme ruler of Gotham's underworld once again.

The New 52
Warren White made his first brief appearance in The New 52 (a reboot of the DC Comics universe) where he was seen attacking guards in Arkham while on Venom.

Great White Shark was later seen at Arkham Asylum at the time when Resurrection Man was incarcerated there.

DC Rebirth
In DC Rebirth, Great White appears as one of Gotham's most powerful crime lords. He is allied with Penguin and Black Mask in an alliance known as "The Blacks & Whites". Together, they hire KGBeast to defeat Batman.

Powers and abilities
The Great White Shark has no superpowers but is a skilled organizer and negotiator with a high-level intellect. After being deformed, he files his teeth to the point of being razor sharp.

In other media

Video games
 The Great White Shark is referenced in the 2009 video game Batman: Arkham Asylum. Solving one of the Riddler's riddles unlocks his in-game bio. The answer to the riddle lies in a jar found in the game's morgue, which contains his nose, lips, an ear, and two of his fingers. This jar of parts is seen again in the 2015 sequel Batman: Arkham Knight in the Gotham City Police Department evidence room with a brief description from Officer Cash.

References

Comics characters introduced in 2003
Fictional businesspeople
Fictional gangsters
Fictional murderers
DC Comics male supervillains
DC Comics supervillains
Characters created by Dan Slott
Fictional characters with disfigurements
Fictional crime bosses
Fictional con artists